Transportes Aereos del Continente Americano, (Air Transports of the American Continent, known and branded formerly as TACA International), operating as Avianca El Salvador, is an airline owned by Kingsland Holdings based in El Salvador. As TACA, it still currently operates as the flag carrier of El Salvador. As Avianca El Salvador, it is one of the seven national branded airlines in the Avianca Group of Latin American airlines, and has been in operation for 75 years.

TACA owned and operated five other airlines in Central America, and its name was originally an acronym meaning Transportes Aéreos Centro Americanos (Central American Air Transport), but this was changed to Transportes Aéreos del Continente Americano (Air Transport of the American Continent), reflecting its expansion to North, Central, South America and the Caribbean.

On October 7, 2009, it was announced that TACA would merge with Avianca, though TACA maintained its name until the merger was officially completed on May 21, 2013. TACA was the second-oldest continuously operating airline brand in Central America and the Caribbean after Cubana de Aviación.

History

Inauguration (1931–1980)

TACA was founded in 1931 in Honduras by New Zealander Lowell Yerex. TACA began operations with a single-engine Stinson plane. Since its beginnings, routes covered all the national territory and its aircraft sported the XH Mexican registration (which were changed later by HR). The idea of its founder was to establish one airline in each Latin-American country, such as Aerovias Brasil in Brazil and other TACAs in Mexico, Venezuela, and Colombia. Out of all the TACA franchise airlines created, only TACA International of El Salvador survived.

As a consequence, in 1945, Yerex left the company and TACA moved its headquarters to the Republic of El Salvador where it was modernized and expanded, the company then established investment groups in other Latin American countries to be sold to domestic airlines, which in the case of Honduras TACA was sold to SAHSA. Later TACA was organized as an international company having its headquarters in San Salvador only under the name of TACA International.
 
During the 1940s and 1950s, the airline began to acquire larger piston engine airliners including the Douglas DC-3 and the Douglas DC-4. The Vickers Viscount turboprop passenger airliner followed in order to expand its route network around the Americas.

On December 28, 1966, TACA International entered the jet age when it inaugurated their first jet, a BAC One Eleven (which was a popular twin jet airplane at the time with other airlines in Latin America). The aircraft model was used until June 1, 1988, when it was phased out in favor of the Boeing 737-200. The Lockheed L-188 Electra four engine turboprop airliner was operated from 1976 by TACA Air Cargo including freight flights to Miami, Florida.

Expansion years (1980–2009)

Until 1980, TACA was owned by a United States company and had its corporate headquarters in New Orleans (due to the civil war raging in El Salvador) under the administration of the Kriete Family of El Salvador, who owned a minority stock and ended up buying all the shares.

According to the July 1983 TACA route map, the air carrier was operating jet service to four destinations in the U.S. from Central America including Houston, Los Angeles, Miami and New Orleans). The airline also made several upgrades to its fleet during the 1980s by replacing the older turboprops as well as BAC One Eleven jetliners with more efficient aircraft, such as the Boeing 737-200 Advanced and 737-300 with the latter type being a member of the Boeing 737 Classic series. TACA later operated wide body Boeing 767s on its scheduled passenger services including international flights to Los Angeles and Miami.

Between 1990 and 1995, TACA bought the majority shares of the flag carrier airlines; Aviateca, LACSA, and Nicaragüense de Aviación, consolidating operations under a new brand group name, Grupo TACA.

In the 1990s, TACA International became the launch customer and principal users of the Airbus A320 in Latin America. These aircraft were substitutes for the aging Boeing 737-200 and the 737-300/-400 series aircraft that were on the fleet, which were gradually retired until 1999.

In 1992, TACA signed a strategic alliance with Panama-based Copa Airlines, and the airline began flying to Tocumen International Airport, making it the first flight connection center in Latin America. As a consequence, Tocumen airport
became the "Hub of the Americas" and the integration of several Latin American airlines to the alliance took place. The alliance ended in 1998 after the six-year period established in the agreement expired.

Then in 2001, having its main hubs in San Salvador and San Jose, the airline set an operations base at Lima, Peru, its first base in South America, causing as a consequence the founding of TACA Perú, of which TACA had 49% shares at. With this new addition, Grupo TACA began to offer a comprehensive network of routes throughout the Americas.

In 2005, TACA International was one of the founding members of the Mexican airline Volaris. In the same year, TACA became the first airline of Latin America to operate the Airbus A321.

In 2008 the board of directors decided to revert to the original name, TACA International (since the consolidation of the acquired airlines was completed), and the airline' headquarters returned to San Salvador, El Salvador to a new building which was inaugurated shortly afterwards. Also, it revealed a renovation in its corporate image. That same year, TACA became the second user of the Brazilian Embraer 190 in Latin America.

AviancaTACA and modernization (2009–12)

On October 7, 2009, it was announced that TACA International would merge its assets in a strategic alliance with Colombian flag carrier Avianca, in which case each will maintain its own trademark and operations. Avianca and TACA International operated a combined fleet of 129 aircraft, serving over 100 destinations in several countries in America and Europe. In December 2009 approval for the merger was given by the Colombian Civil Aeronautical Agency. The merger of Colombia's Avianca and El Salvador-based TACA is the latest sign that consolidation in the Latin American airline sector is picking up.

In June 2011, AviancaTaca signed a Memorandum of Understanding (MoU) for 51 A320 family aircraft, including 33 eco-efficient Airbus A320neos. This made it the largest order for the A320neo in Latin America.

Star Alliance (2010–12)
On November 10, 2010, Star Alliance announced that Avianca and TACA International were to become full members in mid-2012.

Completion of merger and final flight
Avianca and TACA completed their merger on May 21, 2013. On May 20, 2013, just before midnight (12:00 AM), TACA International began to remove all its signs bearing the TACA logo from airports across the US, Canada, Mexico, Central America, South America, and the Caribbean. However, most of the former TACA International Airbus and Embraer jets as well as the TACA Regional jets still have the TACA logo painted on it. These aircraft are expected to be painted with the Avianca logo at a later date. The last flight with the TACA callsign took place on May 20, 2013. The flight was TACA Flight 566 from Monseñor Óscar Arnulfo Romero International Airport in San Salvador to John F. Kennedy International Airport in New York City. It departed San Salvador at 7:50 pm MST and landed in New York at 2:35 am EST. The flight landed two hours and thirty-five minutes after the official re-branding of the airlines; thus, the flight departed with the TACA callsign and landed with the Avianca callsign. The final official TACA flight to have the TACA callsign was TACA Flight 520 from San Salvador to Los Angeles. This flight departed at 7:20 pm MST and landed at 11:50 pm PDT. The first flight departing operated by Avianca El Salvador took place on May 21, 2013. The flight was Avianca El Salvador Flight 561 from San Francisco to San Salvador. The flight departed at 1:25 am PDT and landed at 7:55 am MST. This was followed by Avianca El Salvador Flight 521 from Los Angeles to San Salvador. This flight departed at 1:30 am PDT and landed at 7:30 am MST.

Merger and controversy in Costa Rica (2012–13)

On October 10, 2012, it was reported in a press conference that the trade name TACA International was going to disappear from the public eye and the promotion and marketing strategies were going to be owned by Avianca, according to representatives of the group that controls the brand. The Avianca-Taca's CEO, Fabio Villegas, explained that the use of the single brand for the group would occur in the first half of 2013. Eventually the TACA trade name wouldn't disappear from the public eye TACA will continue to operate but it will operate under the Avianca El Salvador brand and it will remain a full member of Star Alliance. Despite the TACA name permanently retired, Avianca El Salvador still continued to use the IACA and IACO identifiers "TA" and "TAI", along with the call sign "TACA" for Avianca El Salvador Operated flights.

On May 18, 2013, the Avianca-Taca Holding group downgraded the Juan Santamaría International Airport Hub in San José, Costa Rica to a base of operations as part of post-merger restructuring. This included the discontinuation of more than five non-stop flights made by the airline to and from San Jose, including flights to all cities in the United States. As a consequence, more than 200 employees lost their jobs (equivalent to 20% of the work force of the airline). This was controversial in Costa Rica and led to an extensive investigation by the civil aviation authorities of that country against the holding company.

Services

The former airlines that made up Grupo TACA were:
 TACA International
 TACA Regional
 Aviateca
 Inter Regional - operated under Aviateca's code.
 Isleña Airlines
 LACSA
 Nicaragüense de Aviación
 TACA Perú

The airline's hubs before Avianca merger were:
 Monseñor Óscar Arnulfo Romero International Airport in San Salvador, El Salvador
 Jorge Chávez International Airport in Lima, Peru
 Juan Santamaría International Airport in San José, Costa Rica ended in May 2013

Destinations

Avianca El Salvador serves 28 destinations throughout North, Latin, and South America.

Codeshare agreements
The airline has codeshare agreements with the following airlines:

 Avianca
 Cubana de Aviacion 
 Iberia
 United Airlines

Fleet

Current fleet
The Avianca El Salvador fleet consists of the following aircraft (as of February 2023):

Parent company Avianca has a firm order for 100 Airbus A320neos, and some of the aircraft will likely go to Avianca El Salvador.

Former fleet
TACA International operated the following aircraft:

Reciprocal frequent-flyer agreements
LifeMiles is the frequent-flyer program of Avianca and TACA International as of 2009, because of the merger with Avianca. It replaced the old "Distancia" program.

Accidents and incidents

On March 5, 1959, a Vickers Viscount (registered YS-09C) crashed shortly after take-off from Managua International Airport at Managua, Nicaragua when both port engines failed. 15 of the 19 people on board were killed.
On May 24, 1988, TACA Flight 110, a Boeing 737-300 operating to New Orleans, suffered a double engine flame-out due to water ingestion, a result of an in-flight encounter with an area of very heavy rain and hail. The design of the engines and FAA water ingestion certification standards did not take into account the higher water volume of strong or severe thunderstorms while operating at lower power.  The plane landed without further damage on a grass levee at the NASA Michoud Assembly Facility. All 45 passengers were uninjured.
On April 5, 1993, TACA Flight 510, a Boeing 767-200, overran the runway at Guatemala City's La Aurora International Airport due to an inability to brake on the flooded runway.
On May 30, 2008, TACA Flight 390, an Airbus A320-200 (registered EI-TAF), overran a rain-soaked runway on landing at Toncontín International Airport in Tegucigalpa, Honduras. There were 5 fatalities, 2 of which were on the ground.

See also
List of airlines of El Salvador

References

External links

 Official website

 Aeroman.com.sv
 Tus-sentidos.com
 Introducing.lifemiles.com
 Taca-airlines.com

 
 
Airlines established in 1931
1931 establishments in El Salvador
Airlines of El Salvador
Latin American and Caribbean Air Transport Association
Proposed Star Alliance members